Ulrich Roski (4 March 1944, Prüm, Rhine Province – 20 February 2003, Berlin) was a German singer-songwriter who achieved his greatest successes in the 1970s. His songs describe the little quirks hidden in everyone's everyday life, mixing laconic humour with linguistic skill. He produced more than 20 LP's and music CDs since 1970, and some of his songs from this time even made the German TopTen, allowing him to perform at the Berliner Philharmonie. He almost exclusively performed alone.

Roski spent his youth in Berlin-Wedding, visiting the Französisches Gymnasium Berlin together with Reinhard Mey, and learning to play the piano and the guitar. In 2002, he published his autobiography, In vollen Zügen.

1944 births
2003 deaths
People from Prüm
20th-century German male singers
German songwriters
People from the Rhine Province
Französisches Gymnasium Berlin alumni